San Juan de Miraflores is a district of the Lima Province in Peru. It is located in the Cono Sur area of the city of Lima. Is one of the new towns, that have been formed by the massive numbers of people moving from other towns of Metropolitan Lima (such as Miraflores, Surquillo, La Victoria, among others) and from the countryside. During the early 1960s, was mostly a desert area.

San Juan de Miraflores is divided into zones ("A", "B", "C", "D", "E", and "K"). In the early 80's, people from Cuzco, Ayacucho, Pasco, and many of the other departments that were under the attack of terrorists chose San Juan and Villa El Salvador as their new home. As new residents were coming into SJM, two new zones were created: Pamplona Alta and Pamplona Baja. This name was taken in honor of some of the Spanish missionaries (who were from Pamplona, Spain) who offered their help to the residents. One of Pamplona Alta's mains streets, "Pista Nueva" or "New Street", is an example of how new the area is. When it was first settled, many people lived without electricity, water or plumbing, often building their houses from reed mats into the steep hills, with treacherous paths leading to the houses at the top. As residents could afford building materials, they would begin to reinforce these reed mats with plywood, bricks, or whatever else they could find.

Today the houses are a hodgepodge of building materials, most in a state of continual construction as residents can afford each additional brick. Most have access to electricity, but many still lack running water or plumbing. In just the last couple of years the mayor of Lima has launched an extremely successful program to build concrete staircases, or "escapers", into the hillsides, replacing the treacherous paths and dramatically improving the living conditions of residents. These staircases are distinctively painted yellow, with bright blue signs, and neighborhood residents are hired by the city to build them.

In addition to these new zones, 2 more were created. By the year 1981, America and Umamarca were created. Usually, these new zones are well known because of its highly interest of being better every day, since most of the owners are the people who worked most of their lives (and still do) in Ciudad de Dios' Market. These areas were urbanized quickly.

By 1983 and 1984, two new more zones had been created - Maria Auxiliadora and Amauta ("teacher" in English), located between zones "A" and "B". One of the main streets of Maria Auxiliadora is Pedro Miotta, which was well known as the former Panamericana Sur freeway.

Geography
The district has a total land area of 23.98 km². Its administrative center is located 141 meters above sea level.

Boundaries
 North: Santiago de Surco
 East: Villa María del Triunfo
 South: Villa El Salvador
 West: Santiago de Surco

Demographics
According to the 2005 census by the INEI, the district has 335,237 inhabitants, a population density of 13,979.9 persons/km² and 71,384 households.

See also 
 Administrative divisions of Peru

References

External links

Districts of Lima
Shanty towns in South America